Marilyn J. Ryan (born June 13, 1945) is a Democratic member of the Montana House of Representatives. She has served the 99th district, which encompasses southwest portions of Missoula, since January 2017.

Early life, education and career
Ryan was born in Anaconda, Montana. She moved to Missoula in 1968 to attend college at the University of Montana where she received her B.A. in Political Science and her M.A. in Education.

After graduating, Ryan entered the Missoula County Public School System as a teacher of social studies, history and government for middle and high school students, a post she would hold for almost three decades. During that tenure, she utilized her training as a state director in law-related education, specifically Indian law to instruct teachers for the Constitution Rights Foundation and coordinate a U.S. Department of Education History Grant that funded education for Missoula history teachers.

Upon retirement, she served 5 years as President of the Montana Education Association and 4 years as a field consultant for the MEA-MFT, later sitting on Montana's Teacher's Retirement Board as well as its Board of Investments.

Her non-education related public service activity has included work for Kiwanis, United Way and the Moose Can Gully Leadership Team.

Montana House of Representatives
Ryan is the only freshman Democrat (out of 4) on the Appropriations Committee, a coveted spot. She is also a member of the Health and Human Services.

Electoral history
She ran her 2016 campaign on an education tax credit as well as support for alternative energy projects moving forward and an infrastructure bill in 2017. Her endorsements included MEA-MFT, Carol’s List and Montana Conservation Voters.

Personal life
Ryan married her husband Patrick on August 15, 1964.

References

Democratic Party members of the Montana House of Representatives
Women state legislators in Montana
Living people
1945 births
Politicians from Missoula, Montana
People from Anaconda, Montana
21st-century American politicians
21st-century American women politicians